Ruffine Tsiranana (born February 13, 1939, in Ambohimarina, Mandritsara died February 23, 2019, in Paris) was a Malagasy politician.  She was a member of the Senate of Madagascar for Sofia Region. She was the daughter of the late President of Madagascar, Philibert Tsiranana, and the former First Lady of Madagascar, Justine Tsiranana.

References

1939 births
2019 deaths
Members of the Senate (Madagascar)
21st-century Malagasy women politicians
21st-century Malagasy politicians
Malagasy women in politics
People from Diana Region
Children of national leaders